Sindhi Hindus are Sindhis who follow the Hindu religion, whose origins lie in the Sindh region and spread across modern-day India and Pakistani Sindh province. After the Partition of India in 1947, many Sindhi Hindus were among those who fled from Pakistan to the dominion of India, in what was a wholesale exchange of Hindu and Muslim populations in some areas. Some later emigrated from the subcontinent and settled in other parts of the world. 

According to the 2017 census, there are 3.35 million Sindhi Hindus residing within the Sindh province of Pakistan with major population centers being Mirpur Khas Division and Hyderabad Division that combined account for more than 2 million of them. Meanwhile, the 2011 census listed 1.74 million speakers of Sindhi in India, a number that does not include Sindhi Hindus who no longer speak the Sindhi language. The vast majority of Sindhi Hindus living in India belong to the Lohana jāti, which includes the sub-groups of Amil and Bhaiband.

Hinduism in Sindh 
Hinduism in the Sindh region, as in other areas of the Indian Subcontinent, is a native religion of Sindhi people, although in pre-Islamic Sindh, Buddhists were the majority in urban areas. After many unsuccessful raids in 712CE army of Umayyad Caliphate led by Muhammad Bin Qasim successfully invaded Sindh against the last Hindu king of Sindh Raja Dahir. 

Sindh came under control of Qasim after he defeated Raja Dahir and native religions like Hinduism and Buddhism started declining. In the reign of Delhi Sultanate, Hinduism and Buddhism declined very much in this area and became minority religion. Today there are more than 7 million Sindhi Hindus in the Sindh region.

Partition of India 

After the partition of India in 1947, an estimated half of Sindh's Hindus migrated to India, mainly forced by the religious-based persecution of the time. They settled primarily in neighbouring Kutch district of Gujarat, which bears linguistic and cultural similarities to Sindh, and the city of Bombay. As per Census of India 2011, there are around 1,741,662 Sindhi speakers living in India (not counting Kutchi speakers, who are sometimes seen as speaking a Sindhi dialect). There are also sizable Sindhi Hindu communities elsewhere in the world, sometimes termed, the 'Sindhi diaspora'.

Family Names

Conventions 
Most Sindhi Hindu family names are a modified form of a patronymic and typically end with the suffix "-ani", which is used to denote descent from a common male ancestor. One explanation states that the -ani suffix is a Sindhi variant of 'anshi', derived from the Sanskrit word 'ansh', which means 'descended from' (see: Devanshi). The first part of a Sindhi Hindu surname is usually derived from the name or location of an ancestor. In northern Sindh, surnames ending in 'ja' (meaning 'of') are also common. A person's surname would consist of the name of his or her native village, followed by 'ja'. The Sindhi Hindus generally add the suffix ‘-ani’ to the name of a great-grandfather and adopt the name as a family name.

Surnames

Notable Sindhi Hindus 

 Raja Dahir, the last Hindu king of Sindh
 Jimmi Harkishin, British Asian actor
 Ajith Kumar, Indian film actor
 Aftab Shivdasani, Indian film actor. 
 Asrani, Indian comedian and actor.
 Anant Balani, Indian film Director.
 Babita, Indian film actress
 Bherumal Meharchand Advani, Linguist, Historian, Novelist, Poet, Researcher
 Kiara Advani, Indian actress.
 Kalyan Bulchand Advani, Poet, Critique, Scholar
 L. K. Advani, former Deputy Prime Minister of India.
 Nikhil Advani, Indian movie director and screenwriter.
 Pankaj Advani, 23 times world champion in snooker and billiards from India.
 Suresh H. Advani, oncologist who pioneered Hematopoietic stem cell transplantation in India.
 Dr Gurmukh Das Jagwani, former Member of Maharashtra Legislative Council
 Kirat Babani,  freedom fighter, writer, journalist.
 Rana Bhagwandas, Judge on the Supreme Court of Pakistan
 Deepak Bhojwani, Ambassador at Indian foreign service
 Aarti Chabria, Actress
 Vishal Dadlani, Playback Singer
 Bhai Pratap Dialdas, freedom fighter, businessman, philanthropist
 Jairamdas Daulatram, political leader in the Indian independence movement, Governor of the Indian states of Bihar and later Assam.
 Harish Fabiani, Indian (NRI) businessman based in Madrid.
 Khialdas Fani, writer, poet, singer
 Sobhraj Nirmaldas Fani, writer and poet
 Sobho Gianchandani, Pakistani Sindhi social scientist, and revolutionary writer
 Hotchand Molchand Gurbakhshani, Educationist, Scholar and Writer
 Hari Harilela, Indian businessman based in Hong Kong
 Anita Hassanandani, Indian actress
 Gopichand Hinduja, British businessman, co-chairman of the Hinduja Group.
 Indira Hinduja, is an Indian gynecologist, obstetrician and infertility specialist who pioneered the Gamete intrafallopian transfer (GIFT) technique resulting in the birth of India's first GIFT baby.
 Niranjan Hiranandani, co-founder and managing director of Hiranandani Group
 Popati Hiranandani,  writer
 Surendra Hiranandani, co-founder and managing director of Hiranandani Group 
 Lakhumal Hiranand Hiranandani, Indian Otorhinolaryngologist.
 Rajkumar Hirani, popular Indian film director and editor.
 Micky Jagtiani, chairman and owner of Landmark Group.
 Kamna Jethmalani, Indian actress.
 Ram Jethmalani, Indian senior lawyer, former Law Minister of India.
 Motilal Jotwani, Indian writer, educator, follower of Gandhi, fellow of Harvard Divinity School. 
 Hemu Kalani, freedom fighter.
 Atul Khatri, Stand-up comedian.
 Chanda Kochhar (née Advani), Former MD and chief executive officer of ICICI Bank.
 Krishna Kolhi, Senator, Pakistan Peoples Party.
 Rooplo Kolhi, freedom fighter.
 Jayant Kripalani, Film, Television and Stage actor
 J. B. Kripalani, freedom fighter and President of Indian National Congress
 Krishna Kripalani, freedom fighter, author and parliamentarian.
 Gulu Lalvani, chairman of Binatone.
 Kartar Lalvani, founder and chairman of Vitabiotics.
 Nikita Lalwani, Indian novelist based in London.
 Tej Lalvani, CEO of the UK's largest vitamin company Vitabiotics.
 Shankar Lalwani, Indian politician and Member of Parliament in the 17th Lok Sabha from Indore, madhya pradesh, India.
 Kishore Mahbubani, Singaporean diplomat
 K. R. Malkani, journalist, historian and politician.
 N. R. Malkani, freedom fighter and social worker.
 Rajeev Masand, Indian film critic.
 Rajesh Mirchandani, global communications leader and former British television journalist.
 Gulab Mohanlal Hiranandani, Indian Navy officer who served as the Vice Chief of the Naval Staff. 
 Hansika Motwani, Indian actress.
 Rajeev Motwani, Computer Scientist, Professor at Stanford University. He was an early supporter and advisor of companies like Google and PayPal.
 Kabir Mulchandani, Indian businessman. 
 Kala Prakash, Fiction writer
 Moti Prakash, Poet
 Lila Poonawalla (née Thadani), is an Indian industrialist, philanthropist, humanitarian and the founder of Lila Poonawalla Foundation.
 Chandru Raheja, property developer
 Gulabrai Ramchand, Indian cricketer.
 Ishwardas Rohani, Indian politician and former Speaker of Madhya Pradesh Legislative Assembly.
 Bhagat Kanwar Ram, saint
 Bulo C Rani, Indian music director.
 G. S. Sainani, Indian general physician, medical researcher, medical writer and an Emeritus Professor of the National Academy of Medical Sciences. 
 Meera Sanyal (née Hiranandani), was an Indian banker and politician. She served as CEO and chairperson of the Royal Bank of Scotland in India.
 Sadhana Shivdasani, Indian film actress.
 Sonu Shivdasani, founder and CEO of Soneva.
 Rana Chandra Singh, founder of Pakistan Hindu Party and Federal Minister; seven times member of Pakistan National Assembly.
 Ranveer Singh, Indian actor
 G. P. Sippy, Bollywood movie producer and director.
 Ramesh Sippy, Bollywood movie producer and director.
 Anjana Sukhani, Actress
 Tamannaah (tamannaah bhatia), Indian actress.
 Tarun Tahiliani, Indian fashion designer.
 Hiten Tejwani, Indian actor.
 Sundri Uttamchandani, noted Indian writer.
 Mangharam Udharam Malkani, Sindhi scholar, critic, writer, playwright, literary historian and professor.
 Sunil Vaswani, chairman of the Stallion Group.
 Harchandrai Vishandas, British Indian attorney, politician and former mayor of Karachi.
 Seth Vishandas Nihalchand, merchant and former member of Indian National Congress at the time of Independence.
 Romesh Wadhwani, chairman and CEO of Symphony Technology Group (STG), an alumnus of Indian Institute of Technology Bombay.
 Narendra Hirwani, Indian cricketer
 Radhakrishna Hariram Tahiliani, Former Chief of the Naval Staff, India.
 Dalip Tahil Indian film, television and theatre actor.
 Brahma Chellaney Geostrategist and author

See also 
 Sindhis
 Hinduism in Sindh Province
 Sindhis in India
 Hinduism in Pakistan
 Darya Lal Mandir

Notes

References

Sources 
 Bherumal Mahirchand Advani, "Amilan-jo-Ahwal" - published in Sindhi, 1919
 Amilan-jo-Ahwal (1919) - translated into English in 2016 ("A History of the Amils") at sindhis

 
Hindu communities
Hindu ethnic groups
Ethnoreligious groups in Asia
Ethnoreligious groups in India